Elena P. Ivanova is a nanobiotechnologist/biophysicist, academic, and author. She is a Distinguished Professor at RMIT University, Australia. She is most known for her research on biomaterials and bioengineering, focusing on biomimetics antimicrobial nanostructured surfaces.

Ivanova has authored/co-authored over five books, including New Functional Biomaterials for Medicine and Healthcare, Antibacterial surfaces, and Superhydrophobic surfaces. Her research is primarily focused on design, fabrication and operation of planar micro-devices, with particular emphasis on bacterial taxonomy, biomaterials, immobilization of bio-molecules and micro-organisms in micro/nano/environments, microbial interactions with macro/micro/nano-structured surfaces, and mechano-bactericidal biomimetic nanostructured surfaces.

Ivanova is a Fellow of the Australian Society for Microbiology, Life member of Bergey's International Society for Microbial Systematics (BISMiS), and is associated with several organizations, including the American Society for Microbiology, the American Chemical Society, and Royal Society of Victoria.

Education
Ivanova received her BSc and MSc in Biochemistry from Vladivostok State Medical University in 1979. She then completed her PhD in microbiology at Institute of Microbiology and Virology in Ukraine in 1991, with a dissertation on "The physiological activity of marine microorganisms, associated with the mussel Crenomytilus grayanus." She worked at Pacific Institute of Bio-organic Chemistry, and received her ScD in Microbiology in 1999. Followed by a Diploma in Molecular Evolution and Bacterial Systematics from the University of Antwerp, she enrolled at Pacific Institute of Bio-organic Chemistry, and received her ScD in Microbiology in 1999. She then moved to Australia, earning her JD from the University of Melbourne in 2008, and a GradDip from the Law Institute of Victoria in 2010.

Career
Ivanova began her academic career as a Research Fellow of Far-Eastern Research Institute of State Hydrometeorology and Environment Preservation Committee of the USSR in 1980. She held her next appointment as a Senior Scientist in Pacific Institute of Bioorganic Chemistry (PIBOC) of the Russian Academy of Sciences (RAS) in 1985. Having served in this position for 9 years, she became Postdoctoral Research Fellow at Osaka National Research Institute, Agency of Industrial Science and Technology in 1994. In the following year, she was appointed as an Advanced Technology Researcher in Industrial Technology R&D Department at New Energy and Industrial Technology Development Organization. Between 1997 and 2001, she held concurrent appointments as Senior Scientist at PIBOC FEB RAS, and Fellow in Microbiology at the University of Maryland, Center of Marine Biotechnology. Followed by these appointments, she joined Swinburne University of Technology as a Senior Lecturer. She was promoted to associate professor of Life and Social Sciences in 2003, and became Professor of Science, Engineering and Technology in 2009. After working in this position for 9 years, she joined RMIT University as a professor in 2018, and has been working there as a Distinguished Professor since 2019.

Research
Ivanova has authored over 350 articles, and 30 book chapters, and has 4 patents awarded. She works in the fields of nanobiotechnology, material science, and microbiology.

Nanobiotechnology
Ivanova presented the very first reported physical bactericidal activity of black silicon, which is first synthetic analogue of natural bactericidal surfaces such as insect wings, while giving a prospect for the development of a new generation of mechano-responsive, antibacterial nanomaterials. She has led a research project on biomimetic mechano-bactericidal nanostructured surfaces since 2012. In her studies focused on mechanical rupture of Pseudomonas aeruginosa bacterial cells by cicada Psaltoda claripennis wings, she demonstrated that upon being incubated on cicada wings, Pseudomonas aeruginosa cells are stretched and ruptured by the nanopillar arrays present on the wing surface, resulting in bacterial cell death. Her studies further showed that cicada wings are highly effective antibacterial, as opposed to antibiofouling, surfaces. In 2013, she proposed a biophysical model of the interactions between bacterial cells and cicada wing surface structures, which highlights that mechanical properties play a vital role in terms of determining bacterial resistance/sensitivity to the bactericidal nature of the wing surface. One of her highly cited papers has discussed the diverse structural variations of EPS produced by bacteria of different taxonomic lineages, and highlighted a number of techniques that can be used in studies involving biofilm-specific polysaccharides. With an intention to explore areas related to biodegradation of polymers, she presented an overview of the problems related to plastic pollution in the marine environment, a description of the properties, commercial manufacturing and degradability of poly(ethylene terephthalate) (PET).

Ivanova discussed antifouling and bactericidal impacts of antibacterial surfaces. While demonstrating the bactericidal activity of nanopatterned superhydrophobic cicada Psaltoda claripennis wing surfaces, she provided a model for the development of novel functional surfaces that have the ability to possess an increased resistance to bacterial contamination and infection.

Biomaterials
Ivanova in collaboration with colleagues described the role that surface modification of biomaterial plays in the context of preventing biofilm formation and the attachment of microorganisms. In her studies focused on the understanding of the basis of the mechanical antimicrobial mechanisms, she discussed the progress being made towards the fabrication of optimised, biocompatible, synthetic analogues. In a more recent study, she characterized biomimetic and natural hydrophobic surfaces using in situ atomic force microscopy, highlighted that the air-water interface is heterogeneous in its structure, and confirmed the presence of short–range interfacial ordering.

Awards and honors
1994 - AIST Fellowship, Japan, Foreign Researcher Invitation
1997 - UNESCO Biotechnology Fellowship, University of Maryland
1998 - Governor of Primorye Award
1999 - Morrison Rogosa Award, American Society for Microbiology
2001-2002 - Russian Academy of Sciences Award “Prominent Doctor of Sciences”
2008 - JSPS Fellowship, Japan
2011 - Placed in the top of 5% of cited authors for journals in Chemistry, Thomson Reuters
2012-2013 - Ministry of Education and Science Short-Term Fellowship, Russian Federation
2015 - Distinguished Nanoscience Research Leader Award 2015, Publishing Division of Cognizure
2016 - “Women of Swinburne”, Swinburne University of Technology 
2016 - Visiting professor, Cambridge University, UK; Visiting professor, Institut Charles Sadron, CNRS, France
2016 - Nano-Micro Letters (NML) Researcher Award
2017 - Swinburne 25 book
2017 - Australian Museum Eureka for Scientific Research 
2019 - Distinguished Professor Medal, RMIT University  
2020 - SAGE Athena SWAN at RMIT: Women in STEMM gallery
2021 - ASEC Best Contribution Award, 2nd Int. Electronic Conference on Applied Sciences  
2021 - Best Researcher Award, International Research Awards on Infectious Diseases
2021 - Honorary Advisor, the Universal Scientific Education and Research Network (USERN)

Bibliography

Books
Marine proteobacteria of the family Alteromonadaceae (2001)
Nanoscale Structure and Properties of Microbial Cell Surfaces (2007) ISBN 9781600212420
New Functional Biomaterials for Medicine and Healthcare (2014) ISBN 9781782422662
Antibacterial surfaces (2015) ISBN 9783319185934
Superhydrophobic surfaces (2015) ISBN 9780128011096

Selected articles
Vu, B., Chen, M., Crawford, R. J., & Ivanova, E. P. (2009). Bacterial extracellular polysaccharides involved in biofilm formation. Molecules, 14(7), 2535–2554.
Ivanova, E. P., Hasan, J., Webb, H. K., Truong, V. K., Watson, G. S., Watson, J. A., ... & Crawford, R. J. (2012). Natural bactericidal surfaces: mechanical rupture of Pseudomonas aeruginosa cells by cicada wings. Small, 8(16), 2489–2494.
Webb, H. K., Arnott, J., Crawford, R. J., & Ivanova, E. P. (2012). Plastic degradation and its environmental implications with special reference to poly (ethylene terephthalate). Polymers, 5(1), 1–18.
Hasan, J., Crawford, R. J., & Ivanova, E. P. (2013). Antibacterial surfaces: the quest for a new generation of biomaterials. Trends in biotechnology, 31(5), 295–304.
Ivanova, E. P., Hasan, J., Webb, H. K., Gervinskas, G., Juodkazis, S., Truong, V. K., ... & Crawford, R. J. (2013). Bactericidal activity of black silicon. Nature communications, 4(1), 1–7.
Linklater, D. P., Baulin, V. A., Le Guével, X., Fleury, J. B., Hanssen, E., Nguyen, T. H. P., ... & Ivanova, E. P. (2020). Antibacterial action of nanoparticles by lethal stretching of bacterial cell membranes. Advanced Materials, 32(52), 2005679.
Linklater, D. P., Baulin, V. A., Juodkazis, S., Crawford, R. J., Stoodley, P., & Ivanova, E. P. (2021). Mechano-bactericidal actions of nanostructured surfaces. Nature Reviews Microbiology, 19(1), 8-22.
Linklater, D. P., & Ivanova, E. P. (2022). Nanostructured antibacterial surfaces–What can be achieved?. Nano Today, 43, 101404.

References 

Biophysicists
Biochemists
Academic staff of RMIT University
Living people
Year of birth missing (living people)
Melbourne Law School alumni